The 1937 Birmingham West by-election was held on 29 April 1937.  The by-election was held due to the death of the incumbent Conservative MP, Austen Chamberlain.  It was won by the Conservative candidate Walter Higgs.

References

1937 in England
1937 elections in the United Kingdom
West
1930s in Birmingham, West Midlands